Oscar Penagos (born 2 August 1964) is a Colombian former weightlifter. He competed at the 1984 Summer Olympics and the 1988 Summer Olympics.

References

External links
 

1964 births
Living people
Colombian male weightlifters
Olympic weightlifters of Colombia
Weightlifters at the 1984 Summer Olympics
Weightlifters at the 1988 Summer Olympics
Place of birth missing (living people)
20th-century Colombian people
21st-century Colombian people